During the 2001–02 Israeli football season, Hapoel Tel Aviv competed in the Israeli Premier League.

Season summary
Hapoel Tel Aviv, although unable to claim the title, had a fantastic season in the UEFA Cup. The likes of Chelsea and Parma were knocked out by the Israelis before facing Italian giants AC Milan in the quarter-finals. Hapoel took a 1-0 lead at home, but lost 2-0 away. Nonetheless, the quarter-finals was an achievement to be proud of.

First-team squad
Squad at end of season

Results

UEFA Cup

Qualifying round

First round

Second round

Third round

Hapoel Tel Aviv won 3–1 on aggregate.

Fourth round

Quarter-final

Milan won 2–1 on aggregate.

References

Notes

Hapoel Tel Aviv F.C. seasons
Hapoel Tel Aviv F.C.